The following species in the flowering plant genus Helichrysum are accepted by Plants of the World Online. The taxonomy of this genus is complex and remains unresolved.

Helichrysum abbayesii 
Helichrysum abietifolium 
Helichrysum abietinum 
Helichrysum achryroclinoides 
Helichrysum acrophilum 
Helichrysum acutatum 
Helichrysum adenocarpum 
Helichrysum albanense 
Helichrysum albertense 
Helichrysum albiflorum 
Helichrysum albilanatum 
Helichrysum albirosulatum 
Helichrysum albobrunneum 
Helichrysum album 
Helichrysum allioides 
Helichrysum alsinoides 
Helichrysum alticola 
Helichrysum altigenum 
Helichrysum alucense 
Helichrysum amblyphyllum 
Helichrysum amboense 
Helichrysum ambondrombeense 
Helichrysum ambositrense 
Helichrysum ammitophilum 
Helichrysum amorginum 
Helichrysum amplectens 
Helichrysum andohahelense 
Helichrysum angavense 
Helichrysum angustifrondeum 
Helichrysum anomalum 
Helichrysum antandroi 
Helichrysum aphelexioides 
Helichrysum appendiculatum 
Helichrysum araxinum 
Helichrysum arbuscula 
Helichrysum archeri 
Helichrysum archimedeum 
Helichrysum arenarium 
Helichrysum arenicola 
Helichrysum argentissimum 
Helichrysum argyranthum 
Helichrysum argyrochlamys 
Helichrysum argyrolepis 
Helichrysum argyrophyllum 
Helichrysum argyrosphaerum 
Helichrysum armenium 
Helichrysum arnicoides 
Helichrysum artemisioides 
Helichrysum artvinense 
Helichrysum arussense 
Helichrysum arwae 
Helichrysum asperum 
Helichrysum athanaton 
Helichrysum athrixiifolium 
Helichrysum attenuatum 
Helichrysum aucheri 
Helichrysum aurantiacum 
Helichrysum aureofolium 
Helichrysum aureolum 
Helichrysum aureum 
Helichrysum auriceps 
Helichrysum auronitens 
Helichrysum bachmannii 
Helichrysum bakeri 
Helichrysum bampsianum 
Helichrysum baronii 
Helichrysum barorum 
Helichrysum basalticum 
Helichrysum bellidiastrum 
Helichrysum bellum 
Helichrysum benguellense 
Helichrysum benoistii 
Helichrysum benthamii 
Helichrysum betsiliense 
Helichrysum biafranum 
Helichrysum boiteaui 
Helichrysum bracteiferum 
Helichrysum brassii 
Helichrysum brevifolium 
Helichrysum brownei 
Helichrysum brunioides 
Helichrysum buchananii 
Helichrysum buddlejoides 
Helichrysum bujerianum 
Helichrysum buschii 
Helichrysum caespititium 
Helichrysum callicomum 
Helichrysum calocephalum 
Helichrysum calocladum 
Helichrysum calvertianum 
Helichrysum cameroonense 
Helichrysum campanulatum 
Helichrysum camusianum 
Helichrysum candolleanum 
Helichrysum capense 
Helichrysum cataractarum 
Helichrysum catipes 
Helichrysum cephaloideum 
Helichrysum cerastoides 
Helichrysum cespitosum 
Helichrysum chamaeyucca 
Helichrysum chasei 
Helichrysum chasmolycium 
Helichrysum chermezonii 
Helichrysum chionoides 
Helichrysum chionophilum 
Helichrysum chionosphaerum 
Helichrysum chrysargyrum 
Helichrysum chrysophorum 
Helichrysum citricephalum 
Helichrysum citrispinum 
Helichrysum cochinchinense 
Helichrysum cochleariforme 
Helichrysum compactum 
Helichrysum concursum 
Helichrysum confertifolium 
Helichrysum confertum 
Helichrysum congolanum 
Helichrysum cooperi 
Helichrysum cordifolium 
Helichrysum coriaceum 
Helichrysum coursii 
Helichrysum crassifolium 
Helichrysum cremnophilum 
Helichrysum crispum 
Helichrysum cryptomerioides 
Helichrysum cuspidatum 
Helichrysum cutchicum 
Helichrysum cylindriflorum 
Helichrysum cymosum 
Helichrysum danguyanum 
Helichrysum dasyanthum 
Helichrysum dasycephalum 
Helichrysum dasymallum 
Helichrysum decaryi 
Helichrysum decorum 
Helichrysum decrescentisquamatum 
Helichrysum deltoideum 
Helichrysum denae 
Helichrysum deserticola 
Helichrysum devium 
Helichrysum devredii 
Helichrysum dichotomum 
Helichrysum dichroolepis 
Helichrysum dichroum 
Helichrysum difficile 
Helichrysum diffusum 
Helichrysum dimorphotrichum 
Helichrysum diotoides 
Helichrysum doerfleri 
Helichrysum dracaenifolium 
Helichrysum drakensbergense 
Helichrysum dregeanum 
Helichrysum dubardii 
Helichrysum dunense 
Helichrysum duvigneaudii 
Helichrysum ecklonis 
Helichrysum edwardsii 
Helichrysum elegantissimum 
Helichrysum elephantinum 
Helichrysum ellipticifolium 
Helichrysum ephelos 
Helichrysum erigavoanum 
Helichrysum errerae 
Helichrysum erubescens 
Helichrysum evansii 
Helichrysum excisum 
Helichrysum faradifani 
Helichrysum felinum 
Helichrysum ferganicum 
Helichrysum filaginoides 
Helichrysum filicaule 
Helichrysum flagellare 
Helichrysum flammeiceps 
Helichrysum flanaganii 
Helichrysum foetidum 
Helichrysum foliosum 
Helichrysum × fontqueri 
Helichrysum formosissimum 
Helichrysum forskahlii 
Helichrysum forsythii 
Helichrysum fourcadei 
Helichrysum foveolatum 
Helichrysum fruticans 
Helichrysum fulgens 
Helichrysum fulvescens 
Helichrysum fulvum 
Helichrysum funereum 
Helichrysum gaharoense 
Helichrysum galpinii 
Helichrysum gariepinum 
Helichrysum geayi 
Helichrysum geminatum 
Helichrysum geniorum 
Helichrysum glaciale 
Helichrysum glanduliferum 
Helichrysum glandulosum 
Helichrysum globiferum 
Helichrysum globosum 
Helichrysum glomeratum 
Helichrysum gloria-dei 
Helichrysum glossophyllum 
Helichrysum glumaceum 
Helichrysum goetzeanum 
Helichrysum gofense 
Helichrysum gossypinum 
Helichrysum goulandriorum 
Helichrysum gradatum 
Helichrysum grandibracteatum 
Helichrysum grandiflorum 
Helichrysum graniticola 
Helichrysum graveolens 
Helichrysum griseolanatum 
Helichrysum griseum 
Helichrysum gymnocephalum 
Helichrysum gymnocomum 
Helichrysum hamulosum 
Helichrysum harennense 
Helichrysum harveyanum 
Helichrysum haygarthii 
Helichrysum hebelepis 
Helichrysum hedbergianum 
Helichrysum heldreichii 
Helichrysum helianthemifolium 
Helichrysum heliotropifolium 
Helichrysum helvolum 
Helichrysum herbaceum 
Helichrysum herniarioides 
Helichrysum heterolasium 
Helichrysum heterotrichum 
Helichrysum heywoodianum 
Helichrysum hilliardiae 
Helichrysum hirtum 
Helichrysum homilochrysum 
Helichrysum hookerianum 
Helichrysum horridum 
Helichrysum humbertii 
Helichrysum humblotii 
Helichrysum hyblaeum
Helichrysum hyphocephalum 
Helichrysum hypoleucum 
Helichrysum ibityense 
Helichrysum incarnatum 
Helichrysum indicum 
Helichrysum indutum 
Helichrysum ingomense 
Helichrysum inornatum 
Helichrysum interjacens 
Helichrysum interzonale 
Helichrysum intricatum 
Helichrysum inyangense 
Helichrysum isalense 
Helichrysum isolepis 
Helichrysum italicum 
Helichrysum itremense 
Helichrysum jubilatum 
Helichrysum junodii 
Helichrysum kalandanum 
Helichrysum kashgaricum 
Helichrysum keilii 
Helichrysum kermanicum 
Helichrysum kilimanjari 
Helichrysum kirkii 
Helichrysum kitianum 
Helichrysum korongoni 
Helichrysum kraussii 
Helichrysum krebsianum 
Helichrysum krookii 
Helichrysum lacteum 
Helichrysum lambertianum 
Helichrysum lancifolium 
Helichrysum lanuginosum 
Helichrysum lavanduloides 
Helichrysum lawalreeanum 
Helichrysum lecomtei 
Helichrysum leimanthium 
Helichrysum lejolyanum 
Helichrysum leontonyx 
Helichrysum lepidissimum 
Helichrysum leptocephalum 
Helichrysum leptorhizum 
Helichrysum lesliei 
Helichrysum leucocephalum 
Helichrysum leucocladum 
Helichrysum leucopsideum 
Helichrysum leucosphaerum 
Helichrysum lineare 
Helichrysum lineatum 
Helichrysum lingulatum 
Helichrysum litorale 
Helichrysum litoreum 
Helichrysum longifolium 
Helichrysum longinquum 
Helichrysum longiramum 
Helichrysum lucilioides 
Helichrysum luteoalbum 
Helichrysum luzulifolium 
Helichrysum madagascariense 
Helichrysum maestum 
Helichrysum mahafaly 
Helichrysum malaisseanum 
Helichrysum mandrarense 
Helichrysum mangorense 
Helichrysum mannii 
Helichrysum manopappoides 
Helichrysum maracandicum 
Helichrysum maranguense 
Helichrysum marginatum 
Helichrysum mariepscopicum 
Helichrysum marifolium 
Helichrysum marlothianum 
Helichrysum marmarolepis 
Helichrysum marojejyense 
Helichrysum massanellanum 
Helichrysum mauritianum 
Helichrysum mechowianum 
Helichrysum melaleucum 
Helichrysum melanacme 
Helichrysum membranaceum 
Helichrysum meyeri-johannis 
Helichrysum miconiifolium 
Helichrysum microcephalum 
Helichrysum micropoides 
Helichrysum mildbraedii 
Helichrysum milfordiae 
Helichrysum milleri 
Helichrysum milne-redheadii 
Helichrysum mimetes 
Helichrysum minutiflorum 
Helichrysum mirabile 
Helichrysum mixtum 
Helichrysum moeserianum 
Helichrysum moggii 
Helichrysum molestum 
Helichrysum mollifolium 
Helichrysum monizii 
Helichrysum monodianum 
Helichrysum monogynum 
Helichrysum montanum 
Helichrysum monticola 
Helichrysum montis-cati 
Helichrysum mossamedense 
Helichrysum mundii 
Helichrysum mussae 
Helichrysum mutabile 
Helichrysum mutisiifolium 
Helichrysum myriocephalum 
Helichrysum nanum 
Helichrysum natalitium 
Helichrysum nebrodense 
Helichrysum neoachyroclinoides 
Helichrysum neocaledonicum 
Helichrysum neoisalense 
Helichrysum nervicinctum 
Helichrysum newii 
Helichrysum nicolai 
Helichrysum nimbicola 
Helichrysum nitens 
Helichrysum niveum 
Helichrysum noeanum 
Helichrysum nogaicum 
Helichrysum nudifolium 
Helichrysum nuratavicum 
Helichrysum obconicum 
Helichrysum obductum 
Helichrysum obtusum 
Helichrysum ochraceum 
Helichrysum odoratissimum 
Helichrysum ogadense 
Helichrysum oligocephalum 
Helichrysum oligocephalum 
Helichrysum oligochaetum 
Helichrysum oligopappum 
Helichrysum onivense 
Helichrysum oocephalum 
Helichrysum opacum 
Helichrysum orbicularifolium 
Helichrysum oreophilum 
Helichrysum orientale 
Helichrysum orothamnus 
Helichrysum outeniquense 
Helichrysum oxybelium 
Helichrysum pagophilum 
Helichrysum paleatum 
Helichrysum pallasii 
Helichrysum pallens 
Helichrysum pallidum 
Helichrysum palustre 
Helichrysum pamphylicum 
Helichrysum panduratum 
Helichrysum pandurifolium 
Helichrysum pannosum 
Helichrysum panormitanum 
Helichrysum paronychioides 
Helichrysum pascuosum 
Helichrysum patulifolium 
Helichrysum patulum 
Helichrysum paulayanum 
Helichrysum pawekiae 
Helichrysum pedunculatum 
Helichrysum pendulum 
Helichrysum pentzioides 
Helichrysum perlanigerum 
Helichrysum perrieri 
Helichrysum persicum 
Helichrysum peshmenianum 
Helichrysum petiolare 
Helichrysum petraeum 
Helichrysum phylicifolium 
Helichrysum plantago 
Helichrysum platycephalum 
Helichrysum platypterum 
Helichrysum plebeium 
Helichrysum plicatum 
Helichrysum plinthocalyx 
Helichrysum pluriceps 
Helichrysum polhillianum 
Helichrysum polioides 
Helichrysum polycladum 
Helichrysum pomelianum 
Helichrysum populifolium 
Helichrysum praecinctum 
Helichrysum praecurrens 
Helichrysum proteoides 
Helichrysum pseudoanaxeton 
Helichrysum psiadiifolium 
Helichrysum psilolepis 
Helichrysum psychrophilum 
Helichrysum pulchellum 
Helichrysum pumilio 
Helichrysum pumilum 
Helichrysum pygmaeum 
Helichrysum qathlambanum 
Helichrysum quartinianum 
Helichrysum raynalianum 
Helichrysum reflexum 
Helichrysum refractum 
Helichrysum retortoides 
Helichrysum retortum 
Helichrysum retrorsum 
Helichrysum revolutum 
Helichrysum rhodellum 
Helichrysum × rhodium 
Helichrysum riparium 
Helichrysum robbrechtianum 
Helichrysum roseoniveum 
Helichrysum rosum 
Helichrysum rotundatum 
Helichrysum rotundifolium 
Helichrysum ruandense 
Helichrysum ruderale 
Helichrysum rudolfii 
Helichrysum rugulosum 
Helichrysum rutilans 
Helichrysum saboureaui 
Helichrysum salviifolium 
Helichrysum sambiranense 
Helichrysum sanguineum 
Helichrysum sarcolaenifolium 
Helichrysum saxatile 
Helichrysum saxicola 
Helichrysum scabrum 
Helichrysum schimperi 
Helichrysum scitulum 
Helichrysum sclerochlaenum 
Helichrysum semifertile 
Helichrysum serpentinicola 
Helichrysum sessile 
Helichrysum sessilioides 
Helichrysum setosum 
Helichrysum sibthorpii 
Helichrysum silvaticum 
Helichrysum simillimum 
Helichrysum simulans 
Helichrysum sivasicum 
Helichrysum solitarium 
Helichrysum somalense 
Helichrysum sordidum 
Helichrysum spencerianum 
Helichrysum sphaeroideum 
Helichrysum spiciforme 
Helichrysum spiralepis 
Helichrysum splendidum 
Helichrysum spodiophyllum 
Helichrysum stellatum 
Helichrysum stenoclinoides 
Helichrysum stenopterum 
Helichrysum stilpnocephalum 
Helichrysum stoechas 
Helichrysum stoloniferum 
Helichrysum stolzii 
Helichrysum stuhlmannii 
Helichrysum subfalcatum 
Helichrysum subglobosum 
Helichrysum subglomeratum 
Helichrysum subluteum 
Helichrysum subsimile 
Helichrysum subumbellatum 
Helichrysum sulphureo-fuscum 
Helichrysum summo-montanum 
Helichrysum sutherlandii 
Helichrysum swynnertonii 
Helichrysum symoensianum 
Helichrysum syncephaloides 
Helichrysum taenari 
Helichrysum tanacetiflorum 
Helichrysum tanaiticum 
Helichrysum tardieuae 
Helichrysum tenax 
Helichrysum tenderiense 
Helichrysum tenue 
Helichrysum tenuiculum 
Helichrysum tenuifolium 
Helichrysum teretifolium 
Helichrysum teydeum 
Helichrysum thapsus 
Helichrysum theresae 
Helichrysum thianschanicum 
Helichrysum tillandsiifolium 
Helichrysum tinctum 
Helichrysum tithonioides 
Helichrysum tomentosulum 
Helichrysum tomentosum 
Helichrysum tongense 
Helichrysum translucidum 
Helichrysum transmontanum 
Helichrysum traversii 
Helichrysum tricostatum 
Helichrysum trilineatum 
Helichrysum trinervatum 
Helichrysum triplinerve 
Helichrysum truncatum 
Helichrysum turbinatum 
Helichrysum tysonii 
Helichrysum umbellatum 
Helichrysum umbraculigerum 
Helichrysum undulifolium 
Helichrysum unicapitatum 
Helichrysum uninervium 
Helichrysum vaginatum 
Helichrysum × valentinum 
Helichrysum vernum 
Helichrysum versicolor 
Helichrysum viguieri 
Helichrysum virgineum 
Helichrysum vohimavense 
Helichrysum wightii 
Helichrysum wilmsii 
Helichrysum witbergense 
Helichrysum wittei 
Helichrysum woodii 
Helichrysum xerochrysum 
Helichrysum xylocladum 
Helichrysum yuccifolium 
Helichrysum yuksekovaense 
Helichrysum yurterianum 
Helichrysum zeyheri 
Helichrysum zivojini 
Helichrysum zwartbergense

References

Helichrysum